Pádraig de Brún (13 October 1889 – 5 June 1960), also called Patrick Joseph Monsignor Browne, was an Irish clergyman, mathematician, poet, and classical scholar, who served as President of University College, Galway (UCG). He was also known in friendly informal circles as Paddy Browne.

Formation
De Brún was born at Grangemockler, County Tipperary, in 1889, the son of a primary school teacher, Maurice Browne. He was educated locally, at Rockwell College, Cashel, and at Holy Cross College, Clonliffe, Dublin (at both he was tutored in mathematics by Éamon de Valera). in 1909 he was awarded a BA from the Royal University of Ireland, he was awarded an M.A. degree by the National University of Ireland, and won a travelling scholarship in mathematics and mathematical physics, enabling him to pursue further studies in Paris. He was ordained as a Catholic priest at the Irish College in Paris in 1913, the same year he earned his D.Sc. in mathematics from the Sorbonne under Emile Picard.

After a period at the University of Göttingen, de Brún was appointed professor of mathematics at St. Patrick's College, Maynooth, in 1914. In April 1945, he was elected by the Senate of the National University of Ireland to succeed John Hynes as President of University College, Galway, an office he held until his retirement in 1959. The School of Mathematics, Mathematical Physics and Statistics is based in Áras de Brún, a building named in his honour. He subsequently became Chairman of the Arts Council of Ireland, a position he held until his death in 1960. He also served as chairman of the Council of the Dublin Institute for Advanced Studies.

He was close friend of the executed 1916 leader Seán Mac Diarmada.

De Brún was a prolific writer of poetry, including the well-known poem in the Irish language "Tháinig Long ó Valparaiso". He translated into Irish many classical works, including Homer's Iliad and Odyssey, Sophocles' Antigone and Oedipus Rex, and Plutarch's Lives, as well as Dante's The Divine Comedy.

The French Government awarded de Brún the title of Chevalier of the Legion d'Honneur in 1949, and in 1956, the order Al Merito della Repubblica Italiana was conferred on him by the President of Italy. He was created a domestic prelate (a Monsignor) by the Pope in 1950.

De Brún died in Dublin on 5 June 1960. His brother was Cardinal Michael Browne. His sister, Margaret Browne, married the Irish revolutionary and statesman Seán MacEntee with whom she had a daughter, Máire Mhac an tSaoi, who became an Irish language poet scholar and married Conor Cruise O'Brien. He bought land in Dún Chaoin in the County Kerry Gaeltacht, and in the 1920s he built a house there, where his sister's children would stay.

The Big Sycamore (1958) is a fictionalised account of the early life of the Browne family, written (under the pen-name Joseph Brady) by his brother, Maurice Browne.

Sources
Obituary, The Irish Times, 6 June 1960
University College Galway

References

External links
 
Pádraig de Brún's poem Valparaiso

1889 births
1960 deaths
University of Paris alumni
Alumni of Clonliffe College
20th-century Irish-language poets
Irish mathematicians
20th-century Irish Roman Catholic priests
People from County Tipperary
Translators to Irish
Translators of Dante Alighieri
People educated at Rockwell College
Presidents of the University of Galway
Irish expatriates in France
Translators from Italian
Academics of the Dublin Institute for Advanced Studies
Academics of St Patrick's College, Maynooth